Utvälinge is a locality situated in Helsingborg Municipality, Skåne County, Sweden with 227 inhabitants in 2010.

References

External links

Populated places in Helsingborg Municipality
Populated places in Skåne County